Eremophila petrophila is a flowering plant in the figwort family, Scrophulariaceae and is endemic to Western Australia. It is a tall, erect, open shrub with rough branches, narrow, sticky leaves and pale lilac-coloured flowers.

Description
Eremophila petrophila is an open, erect shrub which grows to a height of  sometimes unbranched in the lower half or alternatively, with many branches sprouting from near ground level. Its branches are rough due to persistent leaf bases and are sticky, sometimes also shiny due to the presence of resin secreted by large numbers of raised, pimple-like glands.

The petal tube is lilac-coloured or very faintly lilac on the outside and white inside with brown or purple spots. The petal tube and lobes are hairy on the outside, the petal lobes are glabrous on the inside, and the inside of the tube is filled with woolly hairs. The 4 stamens are fully enclosed in the petal tube. Flowering time depends on subspecies.

Taxonomy and naming 
The species was first formally described by Robert Chinnock in 2007 and the description was published in Eremophila and Allied Genera: A Monograph of the Plant Family Myoporaceae. The specific epithet (petrophila) is derived from the Ancient Greek πέτρα (pétra) meaning "rock" or "stone" and φίλος (phílos) meaning "dear" or "beloved" referring to the habitat preference of this species.

There are two subspecies
 Eremophila petrophila  Chinnock subsp. petrophila which flowers from June to January, has glabrous leaves and branches with short glandular hairs;
 Eremophila petrophila subsp. densa Chinnock which flowers from July to September and has branches and leaves that are covered with long glandular hairs when young, becoming glabrous as they age.

Distribution and habitat
Subspecies petrophila occurs on hills and rocky slopes from the Hamersley Range south to Waldburg Station in the Gascoyne and Pilbara biogeographic regions. Subspecies densa is only known from between Pimbee and Towrana stations near Gascoyne Junction in the Carnarvon, Gascoyne and Murchison biogeographic regions where it grows on low, rocky hills.

Conservation
This species is classified as "not threatened" by the Western Australian Government Department of Parks and Wildlife, although the subspecies densa is classified as "Priority Three" meaning that it is poorly known and known from only a few locations but is not under imminent threat.

References

Eudicots of Western Australia
petrophila
Endemic flora of Western Australia
Plants described in 2007
Taxa named by Robert Chinnock